In Christianity, evil and sin exist and are represented and personified as  evil beings including fallen angels, demons, and the beasts mentioned in the Book of Revelation. They sometimes appear in the form of animals.

Fallen angels and demons 

In Christianity and other Abrahamic religions, fallen angels are angels who were expelled from heaven. Fallen angels in Christianity originated from the Devil: Luke 10:18 refers to "Satan falling from heaven" and Matthew 25:41 mentions "the Devil and his angels", who will be thrown into hell.

A demon is a malevolent supernatural entity, depicted as evil creatures in Christianity. In Christian tradition, demons are fallen angels and have the same characteristics as their good angel counterparts: spirituality, immutability and immortality. Christian demonology states that the mission of the demons is to induce humans to sin. Demons are also believed to try to tempt people into abandoning the faith, committing heresy or apostasy, remaining or turning into Pagans, or venerating idols (the Christian term for cult images). It is also believed that demons torment people during their life or through demonic possession or simply by showing themselves before persons to frighten them or by provoking visions that could induce people to sin or to be afraid. Demons and fallen angels can take any desired appearance, nevertheless, they were generally described as ugly and monstrous beings by Christian demonologists.

Devil 

In Christianity, the Devil is the personification of evil, who was so enamored with his own beauty and self, that he became vain, and so prideful that he corrupted himself and began to desire the same honor and glory that belonged to God. He eventually rebelled against God in an attempt to become equal to God himself. He is depicted as a fallen angel, who was expelled from Heaven at the beginning of time, before God created the material world, and is in constant opposition to God. The devil is identified with several figures in the Bible including the serpent in the Garden of Eden, Lucifer, Satan, the tempter of the Gospels, Leviathan, and the dragon in the Book of Revelation, and in some depictions he is depicted as a goat.

The serpent 
Genesis 3 mentions the serpent in the Garden of Eden, which tempts Adam and Eve into eating the forbidden fruit from the tree of the knowledge of good and evil, thus causing their expulsion from the Garden. God rebukes the serpent, stating: "I will put enmity between you and the woman, and between your offspring and hers; he will strike your head, and you will strike his heel" (Genesis 3:14–15). Although the Book of Genesis never mentions Satan, Christians have traditionally interpreted the serpent in the Garden of Eden as the devil due to Revelation 12:9, which describes the devil as "that ancient serpent called the Devil, or Satan, the one deceiving the whole world; was thrown down to the earth with all his angels."

Revelation 
The Book of Revelation describes a battle in heaven (Revelation 12:7–10) between a dragon/serpent "called the devil, or Satan" and the archangel Michael resulting in the dragon's fall. Here, the devil is described with features similar to primordial chaos monsters, like the Leviathan in the Old Testament. The identification of this serpent as Satan supports identification of the serpent in Genesis with the devil. Thomas Aquinas, Rupert of Deutz and Gregory the Great (among others) interpreted this battle as occurring after the devil sinned by aspiring to be independent of God. In consequence, Satan and the evil angels are hurled down from heaven by the good angels under leadership of Michael.

Before Satan was cast down from heaven, he was accusing humans for their sins (Revelation 12:10). After 1,000 years, the devil would rise again, just to be defeated and cast into the Lake of Fire (Revelation 20:10). An angel of the abyss called Abaddon, mentioned in Revelation 9:11, is described as its ruler and is often thought of as the originator of sin and an instrument of punishment. For these reasons, Abaddon is also identified with the devil.

Beasts 
Evil beasts are featured and found in Christianity, some of these include dragons and hybrid like entities. These where most significant and depicted in the Book of Revelation, where the devil is depicted as a 7-headed dragon.

Revelation 

The first beast comes "out of the sea" and is given authority and power by the dragon. This first beast is initially mentioned in Revelation 11:7 as coming out of the abyss. His appearance is described in detail in Revelation 13:1–10, and some of the mystery behind his appearance is revealed in Revelation 17:7–18.

The second beast comes "out of the earth" and directs all peoples of the earth to worship the first beast. The second beast is associated with Revelation 13:11–18 the false prophet.

The two beasts are aligned with the dragon in opposition to God. They persecute the "saints" and those who do "not worship the image of the beast [of the sea]" and influence the kings of the earth to gather for the battle of Armageddon. The two beasts are defeated by Christ and are thrown into the lake of fire mentioned in Revelation 19:18–20. In chapter 20 the devil is thrown into the lake of fire where the beast and the false prophet are and will be tormented day and night forever and ever.

Notes

References

Works cited

 
 
 
 
 
 
 
 

Demons in Christianity
Christian eschatology
Christian mythology
Fallen angels
Satan